P'i Do Island is an island in North Korea. It is home to the visitor centre of the Nampo Dam.

References

Islands of North Korea
South Pyongan